[[File:Ga-rei- Zero DVD Cover.jpg|right|thumb|250px|Cover of Ga-rei-Zero'''s Blu-ray/DVD box set by Funimation. From left: Yomi Isayama and Kagura Tsuchimiya.]]
 is an anime adaptation and prequel of Hajime Segawa's manga series Ga-Rei. It is directed by Ei Aoki and animated by AIC Spirits and Asread. The show had previously aired on AT-X, Chiba TV, KBS Kyoto, Sun TV, Tokyo MX TV, TV Aichi, TV Hokkaido, TV Kanagawa, TV Saitama and TVQ Kyushu Broadcasting Co., Ltd. The original airing consisted of a total of twelve episodes and were broadcast from October 5 to December 21, 2008. Funimation Entertainment has a home entertainment, digital, merchandise, and mobile rights license to show the series in North America with a complete DVD series out by 2011.

As a prequel story, Ga-Rei Zero is set before the events of the manga, following Kagura Tsuchimiya and Yomi Isayama—swordswomen and heiresses from a long line of Japanese exorcist families. Both girls suffered a personal tragedy in their lives, yet they develop a strong sister-like bond. As both of them grow up, they both must overcome their weaknesses, accepting being the daughters of exorcists and following their families tradition. Yet tragedy will befall both of them which will turn these two "sisters" into bitter enemies.

The adaptation was announced on the promotional sleeve wrapper of Ga-Rei's sixth volume regarding the green-lighting of the show. A Ga-Rei: Zero television ad was soon aired to promote the show's upcoming release, followed by 30 second commercials that were on the Ga-Rei: Zero websites.

The opening theme, "Paradise Lost", was performed by Minori Chihara while the ending theme, "Yume no Ashioto ga Kikoeru", is performed by Kaoru Mizuhara. "Paradise Lost" was performed twice as an ending theme, for both the third and final episode. A character image song album titled "Ga-Rei Sounyuuka & Image Song Shuu - Yuri-mu Croquette" was released on December 25, 2008. The Paradise Lost single was released on November 5, 2008 while Yume no Ashioto ga Kikoeru single was released on November 26, 2008. 
	
Several character image CDs were also released. The first CD, with vocals by Minori Chihara and Kaoru Mizuhara, was released on February 4, 2009. The second CD, with vocals by Maki Tsuchiya and Mai Aizawa, was released on February 25, 2009. The third image CD, with vocals by Minoru Shirashi and Shinya Takahashi, was released on March 25, 2009. The fourth image CD, with vocals by Tetsu Inada and Norio Wakamoto was released on May 27, 2009.

DVDs of Ga-Rei: Zero, both regular and Director's cut DVD versions, have been released with five volumes starting with the release of Volume 1 on December 26, 2008. Volume 2 was released on January 30, 2009 with Volume 3 subsequently released on February 27, 2009. Volume 4 was released on March 27, 2009. Volume 5 was released on April 24, 2009. Volume 6 was the latest Ga-rei: Zero DVD released on May 29, 2009. Each volume of the DVDs include an OST containing tracks used during the show as well as Special Talk interviews with the cast. The Blu-ray box of Ga-Rei Zero'' was released on July 23, 2010, for 27,000 Yen The Ga-rei Zero Live DVD was released on the same day as the Blu-ray Box for 5,800 Yen.

Episode list

References

General
 

Specific

Ga-rei: Zero